The Times Square Hotel is located in New York, New York. The building was built in 1922 and was added to the National Register of Historic Places on May 4, 1995.

History and description
Built by the developer Henry Claman in 1922, as president of the West Forty-eighth Street Realty Company. Claman had purchased from the Charles A. Christmas estate some buildings that had been at the corner of 43rd Street and 8th Avenue and added them to a lot Claman already owned on 43rd. It was originally called the Claman Hotel (catering to single men). The hotel was soon acquired by Manger Hotels, who changed the name to the Times Square Hotel in 1923, with one floor reserved for women.

A partnership headed by Arthur Schwebel ran the building from 1962 to 1981. In 1963, Shwebel changed the name of the hotel to the "Times Square Motor Hotel," adding the word "Motor "because there was a need for moderately priced hotel accommodations with free parking."

In the early 1970s, the hotel became home to the mentally ill and troubled Vietnam War veterans, and New York City subsequently placed welfare recipients there. After a period of deterioration, Covenant House acquired the building in 1984 as real estate investment.

Common Ground, offering affordable housing for working professionals and the formerly homeless, some of whom live with HIV/AIDS, mental illness, or physical disabilities, acquired the building in 1991 as its flagship supportive housing residence.

See also
 National Register of Historic Places listings in Manhattan from 14th to 59th Streets
 List of hotels in New York City

References

External links

National Register

1922 establishments in New York City
Hotel buildings completed in 1922
Hotel buildings on the National Register of Historic Places in Manhattan
Renaissance Revival architecture in New York City
Times Square buildings
Manger hotels